Park Kultury is the southern terminus of the Avtozavodskaya line of the Nizhny Novgorod Metro. The station opened on 15 November 1989 in the third phase on construction along with Kirovskaya station.

Location
The station is under Molodyozhny Prospekt (Avenue of the Youth) in the south of Nizhny Novgorod, on the edge of the city’s Avtozavodsky Culture Park, from which it takes its name. Exits at both ends of the platform lead to Molodyozhny Prospekt.

History
In the planning phase, the station was called Zhdanovskaya. It opened on 15 November 1989. Three days later, a crack in the tunnel required a temporary closure of the Komsomolskaya–Park Kultury section for repairs.

See also
 List of Nizhny Novgorod metro stations

References

Nizhny Novgorod Metro stations
Railway stations in Russia opened in 1989
Railway stations located underground in Russia